Mustangs of Las Colinas is a bronze sculpture by Robert Glen that decorates Williams Square in Las Colinas in Irving, Texas. It portrays a group of nine wild mustangs at 1.5 times life size running through a watercourse. Fountains give the effect of water splashed by the animals' hooves. The work was commissioned in 1976 and installed in 1984.

Mustangs of Las Colinas Museum is located adjacent to the sculpture, in the east building of The Towers at Williams Square.  The museum has exhibits and a film about the work's creation as well as additional sculptures by Robert Glen.

Williams Square is accessible from the DART Orange Line’s stops at Las Colinas Urban Center station and Irving Convention Center station.

Description
The sculpture commemorates the wild mustangs that were historically important inhabitants of much of Texas. The horses are intended to represent the drive, initiative and unfettered lifestyle that were fundamental to the state in its pioneer days.

SWA Group's design created a shallow watercourse extending  from northeast to southwest across Williams Square, a gently sloping granite-paved open space about  square. The plaza setting for the sculpture won a National Honor Award from the American Society of Landscape Architects.

The sculpture is substantial, but the scale of the surrounding structures keeps it from dominating the space.

References 

1984 establishments in Texas
1984 sculptures
Animal sculptures in Texas
Art museums and galleries in Texas
Bronze sculptures in Texas
Buildings and structures in Irving, Texas
Horses in art
Irving, Texas
Museums in Dallas County, Texas
Outdoor sculptures in Texas
Roadside attractions in Texas
Statues in Texas